Korneliusz Banach (born 25 January 1994) is a Polish professional volleyball player, a two–time Champions League winner (2021, 2022). At the professional club level, he plays for ZAKSA Kędzierzyn-Koźle.

Career
In 2015, he joined the first team of ZAKSA Kędzierzyn-Koźle, and made his debut in PlusLiga.

Honours

Clubs
 CEV Champions League
  2020/2021 – with ZAKSA Kędzierzyn-Koźle
  2021/2022 – with ZAKSA Kędzierzyn-Koźle

 National championships
 2015/2016  Polish Championship, with ZAKSA Kędzierzyn-Koźle
 2016/2017  Polish Cup, with ZAKSA Kędzierzyn-Koźle
 2016/2017  Polish Championship, with ZAKSA Kędzierzyn-Koźle
 2019/2020  Polish SuperCup, with ZAKSA Kędzierzyn-Koźle
 2020/2021  Polish SuperCup, with ZAKSA Kędzierzyn-Koźle
 2020/2021  Polish Cup, with ZAKSA Kędzierzyn-Koźle
 2021/2022  Polish Cup, with ZAKSA Kędzierzyn-Koźle
 2021/2022  Polish Championship, with ZAKSA Kędzierzyn-Koźle
 2022/2023  Polish Cup, with ZAKSA Kędzierzyn-Koźle

References

External links
 
 Player profile at PlusLiga.pl 
 Player profile at Volleybox.net

1994 births
Living people
People from Kędzierzyn-Koźle
Sportspeople from Opole Voivodeship
Polish men's volleyball players
ZAKSA Kędzierzyn-Koźle players
Liberos
20th-century Polish people
21st-century Polish people